The 2017–18 Cal Poly Mustangs men's basketball team represented the California Polytechnic State University in the 2017–18 NCAA Division I men's basketball season. The Mustangs were led by ninth-year head coach Joe Callero and played their home games at Mott Athletic Center as members of the Big West Conference. They finished the season 9–22, 4–12 in Big West play to finish in seventh place. They lost in the quarterfinals of the Big West tournament to UC Santa Barbara.

Previous season
The Mustangs finished the 2016–17 season 11–20, 6–10 in Big West play to finish in seventh place. They lost to UC Davis in the quarterfinals of the Big West tournament.

Offseason

Departures

Incoming transfers

2017 recruiting class

2018 recruiting class

Roster

Schedule and results

|-
!colspan=9 style=| Exhibition

|-
!colspan=9 style=| Non-conference regular season

|-
!colspan=9 style=| Big West regular season

|-
!colspan=9 style=| Big West tournament

References

Cal Poly Mustangs men's basketball seasons
Cal Poly
Cal Poly Mustangs men's basketball team
Cal Poly Mustangs men's basketball team